Murderworld may refer to:

 Murderworld (comics), a series of fictional theme-parks in Marvel comics run by the character Arcade
 Murderworld!, a role-playing game adventure for the Marvel Super Heroes role-playing game
 "Murderworld", a song on the White Zombie album Make Them Die Slowly